The Michigan Molecular Institute (MMI) was an advanced polymer research and education organization based in Midland, Michigan which ceased operations in 2015.  MMI was founded in 1971 as an independent, nonprofit research and education organization for the purpose of conducting basic and applied research in polymer science and technology. The research focus was primarily on materials science, with specialties in the fields of photonics, membranes, specialty coatings, unique delivery systems, analytical testing and other areas. 
In later years, the Institute modified its mission statement to emphasize technological development with a commercial orientation in mind. In addition to its research initiatives, MMI served as the launching pad for several spinout businesses, including Dendritech, a commercial dendrimer production facility; Impact Analytical, which provides analytical testing to a wide variety of companies; Oxazogen, a commercialization company in the development and manufacture of coating materials, production of specialty polymers and ongoing polymer research; and the Midland Information Technology Consortium (MITCON), which provides IT services and support to more than 35 non-profit organizations.

History 
MMI officially opened its doors under the name Midland Macromolecular Institute in the fall of 1972, although the facility had been in operation for the previous year. The building had broken ground in the spring of 1970, and it, like many of Midland's buildings from that era, was designed by local architect Alden B. Dow. The institute hosted a three-day dedication beginning September 28, 1972 with opening ceremonies that featured more than 400 scientists from throughout the world, chamber music from the Cleveland Quartet, several presentations and public tours. The featured speakers for the ceremonies were Dr. Herman Francis Mark, considered by many to be the father of macromolecular sciences, and Dr. Paul J. Flory, who two years later would be awarded the Nobel Prize for Chemistry. Two other speakers were Prof. Dr. Donald Lyman and Prof. Dr. Edgar Andrews. Other notable attendees included Dr. Melvin Calvin, the 1961 winner of the Nobel Prize for Chemistry; Dr. Charles Overberger, then the vice-president for research at the University of Michigan; and Herbert D. "Ted" Doan, president of the Michigan Foundation for Advanced Research, which was MMI's primary financial backer in its early days.

MMI's first director was Dr. H.G. Elias, who came to Midland from the Swiss Federal Institute of Technology in Zurich. Beyond funding from MFAR, early financial supporters of MMI were the Herbert H. & Grace A. Dow Foundation, The Rollin M. Gerstacker Foundation and the Charles J. Strosacker Foundation. In the institute's early days, Elias said MMI would be run much like a university department, although its founders expected MMI would advance macromolecular science knowledge in a way that universities could not. One similarity: MMI opened its doors as a not-for-profit organization, which it remains today.

MMI's first 15 years of research of advanced composite materials and polymer technology contributed to Michigan's ability to entice plastics- and composite-related industries to build in the state, and its affiliation with Central Michigan University and Michigan Technological University allowed it to offer master's and doctorate degrees in related research fields. In the early 1990s, MMI began to shift its focus toward creating technology that could be licensed for commercialization.

Over the years, six men have led the institute as President and/or CEO, including Elias (1972–83); Dr. Robert E. Hefner (1985-85 and 1990–92); Dr. John Hoffman (1985–1990); Dr. James D. Allen (1992–1994); Dr. Robert M. Nowak (1994–2009); and Dr. James H. Plonka (2009–2015).

The Turner J. Alfrey Visiting Professorship 
MMI's emphasis from the beginning on the education portion of its mission led to a steady stream of outside experts through the institute, including the visiting professor program, established in 1973 and renamed in 1981 as a living memorial to the late Dr. Turner Alfrey, Jr. Each year, a leading scientist is invited to teach a short course, visit sponsoring organizations and deliver additional research seminars, benefitting many people by providing a point of connection between local scientists and engineers with the world leaders of the polymer science field. 
TAVP speakers from around the world have been invited to present the latest, most up-to-date information in their particular polymer expertise areas.  Typically, these courses were delivered in an intensive, one-week, daily lecture format. Visiting professors also spent additional time at MMI, participating in one-on-one and research group discussions at the Institute, and in collaborations and discussions with other nearby industrial and academic researchers.  They also prepared and delivered a set of on-site seminars for many of the sponsoring organizations that parallel and supplement the formal course lectures.  Financial co-sponsors of the Turner Alfrey Visiting Professor program included The Dow Chemical Company, Dow Corning Corporation, Michigan State University, Central Michigan University, Saginaw Valley State University, the Mid-Michigan Section of the Society of Plastics Engineers, and the Midland Section of the American Chemical Society.

The list of Turner Alfrey Visiting Professors includes several Nobel Prize winners.

References 

Materials science institutes